Abraham Geiger Kolleg is a rabbinic seminary at the University of Potsdam in Potsdam, Germany.

History 

Abraham Geiger Kolleg was founded 1999 as the only seminary in Germany since the Holocaust, when the Hochschule für die Wissenschaft des Judentums in Berlin was shut down by the Gestapo. The college is named after Abraham Geiger (1810–1874), a German Reform-oriented rabbi and scholar, and is managed by the Rabbis Walter Jacob and Walter Homolka. In 2009, the college ordained Juval Porat as a cantor; he is the first person to be trained as a cantor in Germany since the Holocaust. In November 2010, the college ordained Alina Treiger, who is the first female rabbi to be ordained in Germany since World War II. Her ordination was held at Berlin's Pestalozzistrasse Synagogue, and attended by Christian Wulff, then president of Germany, and Jewish leaders from around the world. In 2011 the college ordained Antje Deusel, who is the first German-born woman to be ordained as a rabbi in Germany since the Nazi era.

Organizational integration 

In 2001, Abraham-Geiger-Kolleg joined the World Union for Progressive Judaism and in 2005, the examinees received accreditation towards the Central Conference of American Rabbis. The first generation of ordained rabbis – Daniel Alter, Tomáš Kučera and Malcolm Mattitiani – left the Kolleg in 2006. Daniel Alter is caring for the Jewish community in Oldenburg, and Tomáš Kučera leads Beth Shalom, a Reform Jewish community in Munich. Malcolm Mattitiani returned to South Africa to lead the Temple of Israel Congregation in Kapstadt.

The five-year long studies take place in conjunction with the Kollegium Jüdische Studien, and upon completion, the examinees receive the title of Magister in Jüdischen Studien. The Kolleg is part of Universität Potsdam, funded by the German government, the Central Council of Jews in Germany, the state of Brandenburg and the Potsdam Leo Baeck Foundation. The founding principal of the Kolleg is Rabbi Professor Dres. Allen Podet, who came from State University College at Buffalo to take the post and served from 2001 to 2002.

Abraham-Geiger-Preis 

The Abraham-Geiger-Kolleg dedicates a biannual prize for Verdienste um das Judentum in seiner Vielfalt or, service to Jewish cultural diversity. Laureates:

 2000: Susannah Heschel
 2002: Emil Fackenheim
 2004: Alfred Grosser
 2006: Karl Lehmann
 2008: Hassan bin Talal
 2009: Hans Küng
 2011: Helen Zille

Emil Fackenheim lecture 

Famous and outstanding representatives of Jewish studies are invited as guest lecturers.
 2003: John Desmond Rayner
 2004: Daniel Boyarin, UC Berkeley
 2005: Jacob Allerhand, Universität Wien
 2007: Michael Marmur, Hebrew Union College, Jerusalem
 2008: Shimon Shetreet, Hebrew University of Jerusalem
 2009: Seth Kunin, Durham University
 2010: David Biale, UC Davis
 2011: David Ruderman, University of Pennsylvania
 2012: Hanna Liss, Hochschule für Jüdische Studien

Hebrew Union College-Jewish Institute of Religion Fellows at Abraham Geiger Kolleg 

Rabbi Dr Dalia Marx, Rabbi Dr Yehoyada Amir, Rabbi Dr Samuel K. Joseph and Rabbi Dr Reuven Firestone are members of the HUC-JIR faculty. They visit Berlin and teach at the Kolleg for four weeks. Rabbis Marx and Joseph have participated twice in this program.

Alumni

Rabbis 
 Lior Bar-Ami 
 Nils Ederberg 
 Alexander M. Grodensky 
 Julia Margolis 
David Maxa 
 Sonja Keren Pilz
 Ariel Pollak 
 Eli Reich
 Fabian Sborovsky 
 Adrian Michael Schell

Cantors
 Isidoro Abramowicz 
 Nikola David 
 Assaf Levitin
 Sofia Falkovich 
 Amnon Seelig 
 Aviv Weinberg 
 Alexander Zacharenko
 Juval Porat

References

External links
 Deutschen Welle TV about the Kolleg
 www.abraham-geiger-kolleg.de Homepage
 Official website of University of Potsdam 
 Homepage of Leo-Baeck-Foundation in  Potsdam
 Germany's only rabbinic seminary

University of Potsdam
Universities and colleges in Brandenburg
University
Educational institutions established in 1991
Reform Judaism in Germany
Seminaries and theological colleges in Germany
Jewish seminaries
1991 establishments in Germany